Sultan Ahmad Al-Muazzam Shah Ibni Al-Marhum Bendahara Sri Maharaja Tun Ali (23 May 1836 – 9 May 1914) was the sixth Raja Bendahara of Pahang and the founder and first modern Sultan of Pahang. Commonly known as Tun Wan Ahmad before his accession, he seized the throne in 1863 after defeating his elder brother Tun Mutahir in the Pahang Civil War, assuming the title Sri Paduka Dato' Bendahara Siwa Raja Tun Ahmad. In the early years of his reign, Pahang descended into turmoil, with various attempts made by the surviving sons of Tun Mutahir, based in Selangor, to overthrow him. This led to Pahang's decisive involvement in the Selangor Civil War that successfully brought it to a conclusive end.

The civil wars that ravaged the land had led to the rise of dissension among the ruling class and territorial chiefs who were thenceforth divided into factions. In 1881, prompted by his dwindling authority both within Pahang and among his counterparts in the western Malay states, Tun Wan Ahmad took upon the title of Sultan Ahmad al-Muadzam Shah and formally proclaimed as sultan by his chiefs two years later. The event marked the revival of Pahang as a sultanate after more than two centuries of union with the crown of Johor. Ahmad gained formal recognition from the British Straits Settlements government in 1887, in return for signing a treaty with the British which compelled him to accept a British Agent in his court.

Reign 

During his reign, Pahang politics came under the purview of the British government. Increasing pressure was exerted upon the sultan by the residing British Agent to administer the state according to the British ideals of "just rule" and modernisation. This had effectively plunged the state into discontent with clashes between traditional chiefs and the British. The British ultimately compelled Tun Wan Ahmad to put his state under the British protectorate in 1888 and John Pickersgill Rodger was appointed Pahang's first Resident.

The work of building up a state administration began with the creation of the Supreme Court, a police force and a State Council. In 1895, the sultan entered into a Treaty of Federation to form the Federated Malay States. Tun Wan Ahmad transferred his executive and administrative powers to his eldest son Tengku Long Mahmud, due to old age in 1909, retaining his position and titles as head of state until his death in 1914.

Early life
On 23 May 1836 at Pulau Maulana, Pekan, Che Puan Long, a wife of the 22nd Bendahara of the Johor Empire, Tun Ali, gave birth to a son Wan Ahmad, for whom an Arab, Habib Abdullah ibni Omar Al-Attas foretold he would lead a great future. Wan Ahmad is the patrilineal descendant of the 13th Bendahara who was proclaimed as the 10th Sultan of Johor, Abdul Jalil Shah IV. After the accession, Abdul Jalil was given the special province of the Bendaharas, who ruled the state as the vassal of the Johor sultanate. However, during the reign of Tun Abdul Majid, and with the gradual dismemberment of the empire, Pahang's status changed from a provincial state (Tanah Pegangan) to a fiefdom (Tanah Kurnia), thus the reigning Bendahara assumed the title Raja Bendahara (king grand vizier). It was not until 1853, when Pahang under the rule of his father, formally declared independence.

Wan Ahmad was educated privately in his father's court. He was granted Kuantan and Endau as his fief by his father when he was at a very young age. However, he was opposed in his control of these territories by his brother, after the latter's succession in 1857.

Civil war

The dispute over the territories of Kuantan and Endau prompted Wan Ahmad to oppose his brother. The tensions among the two brothers escalated into a bitter civil war, shortly after the death of their father in 1857. His elder brother, Tun Mutahir was supported by Johor to the south, and by the British Straits Settlements who were then opposing the Siamese Rattanakosin Kingdom. Wan Ahmad, 22 years old at that time, was helped by the Terengganu faction, a Malay sultanate to the north, and by the Siamese. Both sides, whose outside supporters had ulterior motives, engaged chiefly in raids and ambushes, with occasional battles near fortifications along the vast riverine system of Pahang. Siamese vessels sent to assist Wan Ahmad in 1862 were routed by the British warships. The war ceased soon after Wan Ahmad's troops conquered and established control over a number of important towns and regions in the interior, and eventually seizing the capital, Pekan. Tun Mutahir retreated to Temai and in May 1863, he fled to Kuala Sedili, where he died with his son Wan Koris.

Ahmad owed his victory in the war partly to his outstanding ability as a field commander. The victor was formally installed ruler by his chiefs with the title Bendahara Siwa Raja Tun Ahmad, thus ended the fratricidal struggle between the two brothers. The new Raja Bendahara signaled his victory by proclaiming amnesty to those chiefs and subjects who had aided his enemies. He also rewarded the wealthy businessmen who had rendered him financial assistance during the war by leasing to them the state's salt and opium monopolies.

The sultan was appointed an Honorary Knight Commander of the Order of St Michael and St George (KCMG) in the November 1902 Birthday Honours list.

References

A
Founding monarchs
1836 births
1914 deaths
House of Bendahara of Johor
Honorary Knights Commander of the Order of St Michael and St George
Federated Malay States people
People from British Malaya
1880s establishments in British Malaya
19th-century monarchs in Asia
20th-century Malaysian politicians